Arsid Kruja (born 8 June 1993) is an Albanian football player who plays for Vllaznia Shkodër in the Kategoria Superiore.

Career

Early career
Kruja signed a three-year contract extension in January 2014 with a €100,000 release clause.

In January 2015 he joined Saudi Professional League side Hajer Club for a transfer fee of $70,000, where he signed a three-year contract worth $300,000.

He was loaned back to the Albanian Superliga as he signed an 18-month loan deal with Flamurtari Vlorë shortly after signing for Hajer Club. However, Kruja's loan at Flamurtari was cut short and he subsequently went to join another Superliga club in Laçi on a season-long loan deal.

References

1993 births
Living people
Footballers from Shkodër
Albanian footballers
Association football forwards
Albania under-21 international footballers
KF Vllaznia Shkodër players
Hajer FC players
Flamurtari Vlorë players
KF Laçi players
KF Teuta Durrës players
Kategoria Superiore players
Kategoria e Parë players
Albanian expatriate footballers
Expatriate footballers in Saudi Arabia
Albanian expatriate sportspeople in Saudi Arabia